Garcia Moniz was a Portuguese nobleman.

Life
He was the eldest son of Rui Gil Moniz and wife Filipa de Almada.

He held the office of his father of Treasurer of the Casa da Moeda of Lisbon and was a Commander of Nossa Senhora da Conceição of Lisbon, Fidalgo of the Royal Household of King John III of Portugal.

Marriages and issue
He married firstly Brites Pereira, daughter of the Licentiate Luís Esteves da Veiga Lobo, Over Judge of the House of the Civil, and wife, without issue, and married secondly Genebra ..., daughter of Cristóvão Juzarte, from Azinhaga, and wife, without issue, and had a bastard daughter: 
 Margarida or Madalena Moniz, the daughter of a tarnished woman, who was a cow and married lowerly, wife of a mechanical officer named Pero Fernandes

Sources
 Manuel João da Costa Felgueiras Gaio, "Nobiliário das Famílias de Portugal", Tomo Vigésimo Primeiro, Título de Monizes, § 17, § 18 e § 19
 Various Authors, "Armorial Lusitano", Lisbon, 1961, pp. 370–372
 Dom Augusto Romano Sanches de Baena e Farinha de Almeida Portugal Sousa e Silva, 1.º Visconde de Sanches de Baena, "Archivo Heraldico-Genealógico", Lisbon, 1872, Volume II, p. CXV
 Cristóvão Alão de Morais, "Pedatura Lusitana", Volume I (reformulated edition), pp. 668–670

Portuguese nobility
Year of birth unknown
Year of death unknown
16th-century Portuguese people